Yangi-Aul (Yañawıl) is a rural locality (a village) in Davletovsky Selsoviet, Abzelilovsky District, Bashkortostan, Russia. The population was 311 as of 2010. There are 3 streets.

Geography 
Yangi-Aul is located 15 km east of Askarovo (the district's administrative centre) by road. Davletovo is the nearest rural locality.

References 

Rural localities in Abzelilovsky District